All of the 48 states of the United States of America plus several of its territories and the District of Columbia issued individual passenger license plates dated for the year 1942, and due to metal conservation for World War II, 1943 and 1944 for most states. In 1942, automobile production in the United States was halted for the duration of World War II, and many automobile factories were converted to munitions or other war-oriented industrial manufacturing purposes until 1946.

Most states conserved metal for World War II in some way. Many states stopped issuing front plates, while other states such as Illinois issued license plates made out of soybean fiberboard. Most states either issued plates intended to be revalidated with metal tabs or revalidated license plates with tabs. Some other states, such as Wisconsin, used small plates.

Passenger baseplates

Non-passenger plates

See also

Antique vehicle registration
Electronic license plate
Motor vehicle registration
Vehicle license

References

External links

1942 in the United States
1942